The 2009 Swiss Open Super Series was the fourth tournament of 2009 BWF Super Series badminton tournament. It was held from March 10 to March 15, 2009 in Basel, Switzerland.

Seeds

Men's singles
 Lee Chong Wei
 Lin Dan
 Chen Jin
 Peter Gade
 Sony Dwi Kuncoro
 Joachim Persson
 Taufik Hidayat
 Przemysław Wacha

Women's singles
 Tine Rasmussen
 Zhou Mi
 Lu Lan
 Pi Hongyan
 Xie Xingfang
 Zhu Lin
 Wang Lin
 Xu Huaiwen

Men's doubles
 Lars Paaske / Jonas Rasmussen
 Koo Kien Keat / Tan Boon Heong
 Mathias Boe / Carsten Mogensen
 Mohd Zakry Abdul Latif / Mohd Fairuzizuan Mohd Tazari
 Lee Yong-dae / Shin Baek-cheol
 Fu Haifeng / Cai Yun
 Michal Logosz/Robert Mateusiak
 Anthony Clark / Nathan Robertson

Women's doubles
 Chien Yu Chin / Cheng Wen-Hsing
 Chin Eei Hui / Wong Pei Tty
 Lee Kyung-won / Lee Hyo-jung
 Du Jing / Yu Yang
 Ha Jung-eun / Kim Min-jung
 Lena Frier Kristiansen / Kamilla Rytter Juhl
 Zhang Yawen / Zhao Tingting
 Shendy Puspa Irawati / Meiliana Jauhari

Mixed doubles
 Nova Widianto / Lilyana Natsir
 Lee Yong-dae / Lee Hyo-jung
 He Hanbin	/ Yu Yang
 Anthony Clark / Donna Kellogg
 Thomas Laybourn / Kamilla Rytter Juhl
 Robert Blair /  Imogen Bankier
 Sudket Prapakamol / Saralee Thungthongkam
 Xie Zhongbo / Zhang Yawen

Men's singles

Women's singles

Men's doubles

Women's doubles

Mixed doubles

Notes

External links
Swiss Super Series 2009 at tournamentsoftware.com

Swiss Open (badminton)
Open Super Series
Swiss Open